Southwest is one of the 26 officially recognized neighborhoods of Syracuse, New York.

Geography
It borders five other Syracuse neighborhoods, with Downtown Syracuse to the north, University Hill to the east, Brighton to the south, and Strathmore and Near Westside to the west.

References

External links 
Neighborhoods map

Neighborhoods in Syracuse, New York